Polly Hannah Klaas (January 3, 1981 – October 1, 1993) was an American murder victim whose case garnered national media attention. On October 1, 1993, at age twelve, she was kidnapped at knifepoint during a slumber party at her mother's home in Petaluma, California, and was later strangled. Richard Allen Davis was convicted of her murder in 1996 and sentenced to death.

Background
On October 1, 1993, Polly Klaas and two friends were having a slumber party. Around 10:30 pm, an intoxicated Richard Allen Davis entered their bedroom, carrying a knife from the Klaas's kitchen. He told the girls he was there to do no harm and was only there for money. Davis tied up both of her friends, pulled pillowcases over their heads, and told them to count to 1,000. He then kidnapped Klaas.

Over the next two months, about 4,000 people helped search for Klaas. TV shows such as 20/20 and America's Most Wanted covered the kidnapping. An APB (all-points bulletin) with the suspect's information was broadcast within 30 minutes of the kidnapping. The broadcast, however, only went out over Sonoma County Sheriff's Channel 1.

She phoned the property owner, who decided to leave with her daughter. As she drove down the long driveway to Pythian Road, the owner passed Davis. She called 911 when she got to a service station and two deputies were dispatched on the call. The deputies did not know of the kidnapping or the suspect's description, due to Sonoma Valley units being on Channel 3. The deputies ran Davis's driver's license and license plate number, but they came back with no wants or warrants. The deputies tried to convince the property owner to perform a citizen's arrest for trespassing. Under California law, a civilian may make an arrest for this type of misdemeanor. The property owner would have had to go to the car with the deputies and say "I arrest you." The deputies then would have taken Davis into custody. The property owner refused.

The deputies called for a tow truck to get Davis's car out of the ditch. They searched it thoroughly before the arrival of the tow truck and did not find evidence of anyone else in the car. The only possible violation was an open container of beer, but Davis was not driving at the time of the deputies' contact and mere possession of an open container was not illegal. Before Davis was allowed to leave, he was instructed to pour out the beer and the deputies filled out an FI (Field Interrogation) card with his information and the FI card was filed.

On November 28, 1993, the property owner was inspecting her property after loggers had partially cleared the area of trees. She discovered items that made her think they may be related to the kidnapping. She called the sheriff's department to report her discovery, and deputies and crime scene investigators were dispatched. A torn pair of ballet leggings were found that were later matched by the FBI Crime Laboratory to the other part of the leggings which were taken as evidence on the night of the kidnapping. A review of calls in the area the day of the kidnapping turned up the contact with Davis, who had only been identified because both deputies had filled out and filed the FI card. Once the identity of Davis was revealed, his palm print at the scene of the kidnapping was also traced to him. Authorities had been unable to match the partial print earlier due to the poor quality of the print left.

The Sonoma County Sheriff's Department, in cooperation with Petaluma Police and the FBI, launched a search of the property and the Pythian Road area during a heavy rainstorm. The first two days of the search were kept as low-key as possible, since Davis was under surveillance at an Indian rancheria near Ukiah, California. When nothing was found during the initial search and the surveillance of Davis also produced no results, the decision was made to arrest him for the kidnapping of Klaas.

While Davis was being interrogated by Petaluma PD and the FBI, a massive search was launched on Friday, December 3. The Sonoma County Sheriff's Department was assisted by over 500 search team members from 24 agencies, coming from as far away as Kern County, California, and Washoe County, Nevada. The mutual aid effort was coordinated by the California State Office of Emergency Services (now known as the California Governor's Office of Emergency Services), FBI Crime Scene teams, and numerous other state and federal agencies. The search remains today as one of the largest ever conducted in California. The search continued through Saturday, December 4. The search effort produced other items of evidence, but did not produce any evidence of human remains. The search was planned to continue on Sunday, December 5, but on the evening of December 4, Davis confessed to kidnapping and murdering Klaas and led investigators to her body. He had buried her in a shallow grave just off Highway 101, about a mile south of the city limits of Cloverdale, California. The gravesite is about 20 air miles and about 30 road miles from the search site.

Although Davis admitted to strangling Klaas to death, he refused to give investigators a timeline of the events from October 1. Investigators thought he was fearful that both people who passed him would call the sheriff's department. It is believed that he killed her before the arrival of deputies and hid her body in the thick brush on the hillside above where his car was stuck. He then waited for an undetermined period of time after being escorted back to Highway 12, about 1.5 miles from where his car was stuck, and drove back up to retrieve her body. He was reportedly out of breath, sweating profusely (despite it being a cool night), and had twigs and leaves in his hair when contacted by deputies. It is also believed that he had chosen the gravesite in advance, since it would not have been discovered by a casual observer. The gravesite area would be directly visible from Highway 101, but not the grave itself. He had to drive from the Indian Rancheria in Ukiah once a week to meet with his parole officer and he would have seen any police activity in the area.

Conviction
After a long and tumultuous trial, Davis was convicted on June 18, 1996, of first-degree murder with four special circumstances (robbery, burglary, kidnapping, and attempted lewd act on a child) in Klaas's death. A San Jose Superior Court jury returned a verdict of death. At his formal sentencing, Davis provoked national outrage by taunting his victim's family, extending both middle fingers at a courtroom camera and later saying that Klaas's last words just before he killed her implied that her father molested her. Judge Thomas Hastings then formally sentenced Davis to death, telling Davis that his conduct in the courtroom made the decision to pass the death sentence significantly easier.

Winona Ryder
Actress Winona Ryder, who had been raised in Petaluma, offered a $200,000 reward for Klaas's safe return during the search. Ryder starred in a film version of Little Women after Klaas's death and dedicated it to her memory, because it had been Klaas's favorite book.

Aftermath and legacy
Klaas's body was cremated and her ashes were spread over the Pacific Ocean by her friends and family.

In the wake of the murder, Klaas's father, Marc Klaas, became a child advocate and established the KlaasKids Foundation. He has made himself available to parents of kidnapped children and has appeared frequently on Larry King Live, CNN Headline News and Nancy Grace.

The all-points bulletin was broadcast on the CHP (California Highway Patrol) channel, which only CHP radios could receive. CHP practice changed after the case. The radio system was upgraded and such bulletins are now broadcast on all police channels through a centralized 911 dispatch system.

In October 1998, a performing arts center was named in her honor in Petaluma, but was closed in 2000 because of a lack of funding. As of August 2022, a renovation of the building was expected to be completed by the end of the year so the center could reopen.

In the wake of the murder, politicians in California and other U.S. states supported three strikes laws and California's Three Strikes act was signed into law on March 8, 1994.

Media

Investigation Discovery re-enacted the kidnapping and murder in Motives & Murder: Cracking the Case: Who Took Polly Klaas? (Season 4 Episode 4, 10/22/2014).

The A&E television series American Justice released the episode "Free to Kill: The Polly Klaas Murder". The episode exposes the challenges of the penal system to rehabilitate inmates. Davis had been in and out of jail, his convictions ranging from kidnapping to burglary. The episode originally aired October 23, 1996.

The Discovery Channel crime series The FBI Files''' first episode's topic was the Polly Klaas case. The episode reveals the details of the FBI agents' collection of evidence and their hunt for the criminal, and originally aired October 20, 1998.

On May 9, 2022, Crime Junkie released an episode on Polly Klaas and discussed how the case set a precedent for California's Three Strikes law.

References

Further reading
Tresniowski, Alex. "Polly, Alive in Memory." People. September 22, 2003. Vol. 60, No. 12.
Warren, Jennifer. "Officer Details Suspect's Confession in Klaas Case : Courts: Detective testifies that Richard Davis said he strangled the girl to avoid imprisonment for kidnaping." Los Angeles Times''. May 13, 1994.

External links
Polly Klaas Foundation
KlaasKids Foundation The Foundation's mission is to stop crimes against children.
Crime Library Article on Polly Klaas

1993 in California
1993 murders in the United States
Murder in the San Francisco Bay Area
History of Sonoma County, California
Capital murder cases
Deaths by person in California
Kidnappings in the United States
Child sexual abuse in the United States
October 1993 crimes
October 1993 events in the United States
Female murder victims
Murdered American children
Incidents of violence against girls